Clethra canescens var. clementis is a tree in the family Clethraceae.

Description
The smooth bark is pale brown. The scented flowers are white.

Distribution and habitat
Clethra canescens var. clementis is endemic to Borneo. Its habitat is montane forests, occasionally lowland forests.

References

canescens
Endemic flora of Borneo
Trees of Borneo
Plants described in 1918